Qamashi District is a district of Qashqadaryo Region in Uzbekistan. The capital lies at Qamashi. The district consists of one city (Qamashi), 5 urban-type settlements (Balandchayla, Qoratepa, Qiziltepa, Sarbozor, Badahshon) and 11 rural communities.

References

Qashqadaryo Region
Districts of Uzbekistan